Anthousa (Greek: Ανθούσα, before 1928: Λεπενίτσα - Lepenitsa) is an Aromanian (Vlach) village in the municipal unit of Aspropotamos in the western part of the Trikala regional unit, Greece. It is located in the southern Pindus mountains, 36 km west of Kalambaka, and 12 km south of Metsovo.  The 2011 census recorded 61 residents in Anthousa. The community of Anthousa covers an area of 38.723 km2.

Population

See also
List of settlements in the Trikala regional unit

References

External links
 lipinitsa.gr - Information on Anthoussa in the Trikala prefecture
 Anthoussa on GTP Travel Pages

Aromanian settlements in Greece
Populated places in Trikala (regional unit)